The Ministry of Infrastructure and Regional Development of Moldova is one of the fourteen ministries of the Government of Moldova.

History
Ministry of Infrastructure and Regional Development was founded on 24 January 1997, as part of First Ciubuc Cabinet. Over years, it was restructured a few times and renamed, as follows:

Ministry of Environment, Public Works and Regional Development (2001–2004)
Ministry of Industry and Infrastructure (2004–2008)
Ministry of Construction and Regional Development (2008–2011)
Ministry of Infrastructure and Regional Development (2021–present)

In 2017 as part of the government reform in Moldova, the Ministry of Economy was renamed to Ministry of Economy and Infrastructure, absorbing the Ministry of Transport and Roads Infrastructure, and the Ministry of Informational Technologies and Communications, becoming their legal successor. Also this ministry took the domain of constructions from the former Minister of Construction and Regional Development.

List of Ministers of Infrastructure and Regional Development

References

Economy and Infrastructure
Moldova
Moldova
Transport organizations based in Moldova
Ministries established in 1997
1997 establishments in Moldova